The Red Bull Junior Team is a driver development program run by the energy drink company Red Bull GmbH in an attempt to identify potential future racing stars in open wheel racing. The similar Red Bull Driver Search, now ended, was an American spinoff of the same idea held in 2005. Members of the Junior Team are financed and sponsored by Red Bull in lower racing formulae.

The programs have been successful in bringing a selection of drivers into Formula One. Five of them, Sebastian Vettel, Daniel Ricciardo, Max Verstappen, Pierre Gasly, and Carlos Sainz Jr. have won a Formula One race, with two of them (Vettel and Verstappen) having won at least two World Championships. Red Bull owns two teams in Formula One, Red Bull Racing and Scuderia AlphaTauri.

The Red Bull Junior Team was also the name of RSM Marko, a team that competed in International Formula 3000 between 1999 and 2003, sponsored by Red Bull and run by Helmut Marko.

The Red Bull Junior Team was formed in 2001 as Red Bull's European driver programme. Red Bull offers funding and support for the promising young drivers that are part of the programme. In 2004, Christian Klien became the first Red Bull Junior to race in Formula One, while in 2008, Sebastian Vettel became the first Red Bull Junior to win a Formula One Grand Prix, the Italian Grand Prix. Two years later, in 2010, Vettel became the first Red Bull Junior graduate to win the Formula One World Championship.

Current drivers

Graduates to Red Bull Racing in Formula 1

 Championship titles highlighted in bold.
 † denotes currently active Formula 1 drivers.

Graduates to Toro Rosso/AlphaTauri

This list includes drivers who have graduated from the Junior Team to Toro Rosso/AlphaTauri but have not raced for Red Bull Racing. Former Red Bull Junior Team drivers who have driven for Toro Rosso/AlphaTauri and Red Bull Racing appear on the Graduates to Red Bull Racing table.

 Championship titles highlighted in bold.
 † denotes currently active Formula 1 drivers.

Former drivers

 Championship titles highlighted in bold.

Graduates summary

The scheme has been successful, with several of the drivers backed by Red Bull making it into Formula One:
 Enrique Bernoldi – raced for Arrows and was briefly a test driver for British American Racing.
 Christian Klien – raced for Jaguar Racing and Red Bull Racing, and was a test driver for HRT F1 Team.
 Patrick Friesacher – raced for Minardi.
 Narain Karthikeyan – raced for Jordan and HRT and was a test driver for Williams.
 Robert Doornbos – raced for Minardi and Red Bull Racing.
 Vitantonio Liuzzi – raced for Red Bull Racing, Scuderia Toro Rosso and Force India, at one stage attracted the attention of Ferrari after dominant performances in Formula 3000, raced for the HRT F1 Team before being replaced ahead of the  season.
 Scott Speed – raced for Scuderia Toro Rosso in 2006 and 2007. Raced the No. 82 Red Bull Racing Team Toyota Camry in the NASCAR Sprint Cup Series before being released by Red Bull after the 2010 season. Speed currently races in Global Rallycross for Andretti Autosport, where he is 3–time and reigning champion.
 Sebastian Vettel – joined Toro Rosso for the second half of the  season in Scott Speed's place, replaced David Coulthard at Red Bull Racing for the  season. He had been a test driver for BMW Sauber.
 Sébastien Buemi – raced for Scuderia Toro Rosso from 2009 to 2011. He had participated in the GP2 Series Asia and GP2 Series for Trust Team Arden and in A1 Grand Prix with A1 Team Switzerland, as back–up to fellow Red Bull Junior Team driver Jani.
 Jaime Alguersuari – raced for Scuderia Toro Rosso, substituted for Sébastien Bourdais for the second half of the  season before being replaced at the end of the 2011 season. He had won British F3 in 2008 and raced in the World Series by Renault in 2009.
 Karun Chandhok – raced for Hispania Racing and Team Lotus, and was a heritage driver for Williams.
Signed up to replace Mark Webber at Red Bull for the 2014 season, taking three victories and finishing 3rd in the championship standings. Left for Renault at the end of the 2018 season.
 Jean-Éric Vergne – joined Toro Rosso for the 2012 season after finishing second in the 2011 Formula Renault 3.5 Series season. Left the programme to become a test driver at Ferrari.
 Daniil Kvyat – joined Toro Rosso for the 2014 season after claiming the GP3 title the previous year. Signed up to replace Sebastian Vettel at Red Bull for the 2015 season. Demoted to Scuderia Toro Rosso after the 2016 Russian GP, replaced with Max Verstappen. Replaced by Pierre Gasly at Toro Rosso for the  season, joined Ferrari as test and reserve driver. Rejoined Toro Rosso for the 2019 season before being replaced again at the end of 2020.
 Carlos Sainz Jr. – joined Toro Rosso for the 2015 season after claiming the Formula Renault 3.5 title the previous year. Moved to Renault after the 2017 Japanese GP. Joined McLaren for the 2019 season.
 Max Verstappen – joined Toro Rosso for 2015 after finishing third in the 2014 FIA Formula 3 European Championship, having been signed to the Red Bull programme midway through that season. Promoted to Red Bull Racing for the 2016 Spanish GP, which he won on debut. Became  Formula One World Drivers' Champion with Red Bull.
 Pierre Gasly – debuted for Toro Rosso in the 2017 Malaysian GP after winning the 2016 GP2 Series. Joined Toro Rosso full time for the 2018 season. Promoted to Red Bull Racing for the 2019 season to replace Daniel Ricciardo. Demoted to Toro Rosso after the 2019 Hungarian GP.
 Brendon Hartley – joined Toro Rosso for the 2017 United States GP after winning the 2017 FIA World Endurance Championship. Continued with the team the following year before being replaced by Alexander Albon for 2019.
 Alexander Albon – re-signed by Red Bull ahead of the 2019 season to race for Toro Rosso after finishing third in the 2018 FIA Formula 2 Championship. Promoted to Red Bull Racing after the 2019 Hungarian GP, contract not renewed for 2021. Became a Red Bull test driver and joined their 2021 Deutsche Tourenwagen Masters team. Returned to Formula One in 2022 with Williams.
 Yuki Tsunoda – joined rebranded Scuderia AlphaTauri team for the 2021 season after coming third in Formula 2 the previous year.

As well as these, Red Bull has supported many up-and-coming young drivers:
 Neel Jani – a test driver for Sauber, Red Bull Racing, and later Toro Rosso, whilst also representing Switzerland in A1 Grand Prix.
 Colin Fleming – raced in the World Series by Renault with Carlin Motorsport.
 Michael Ammermüller – raced in the GP2 Series with ART.
 Mikhail Aleshin – raced in the World Series by Renault with Carlin Motorsport.
 Adrian Zaugg – raced in World Series by Renault for Carlin Motorsport for a part–season as well in A1 Grand Prix for South Africa.
 Filipe Albuquerque – raced in the World Series by Renault with Epsilon Euskadi.
 Robert Wickens – raced in the World Series by Renault with Carlin Motorsport.
 António Félix da Costa – finished third in the 2012 GP3 Series with Carlin and the 2013 Formula Renault 3.5 Series with Arden Caterham.
 Alex Lynn – won the GP3 Series in 2014 for Carlin.
 Sérgio Sette Câmara – competed in the 2016 FIA Formula 3 European Championship for Motopark. Progressed into Formula 2 without Red Bull's support and was re-signed in 2020 as a test driver for Red Bull Racing and Scuderia AlphaTauri.
 Dan Ticktum – raced part-time in the Super Formula Championship in 2018 and 2019 for Team Mugen.

American spin-off
Red Bull Driver Search was an American spin-off run from 2002 to 2005 in parallel with the Red Bull Junior Team. Its aim was "Searching for the future American F1 Champion". The winner was Scott Speed, who went on to compete in F1 in 2005.

Results

Formula 3000

 D.C. = Drivers' Championship position, T.C. = Teams' Championship position.

See also 
 Red Bull Racing
 Scuderia AlphaTauri

References

External links
 Red Bull Junior Team
 Red Bull Racing
 Scuderia AlphaTauri

Racing schools
Sports organizations established in 2001
Red Bull sports teams
International Formula 3000 teams
Red Bull Racing